The Pasadena Maple Leafs Hockey Club is an amateur youth ice hockey club based in Pasadena, California. It is a member of the Southern California Amateur Hockey Association.

History 
The club was founded in 1964, and is the oldest active youth hockey club in Southern California. Current professional hockey players Nicholas Robertson & Brett Sterling started their playing careers with the Pasadena Maple Leafs.

References

External links 
 Pasadena Maple Leafs Homepage
Southern California Amateur Hockey Association
Pasadena Ice Skating Center
Paramount Iceland

Ice hockey teams in California
1964 establishments in California
Ice hockey clubs established in 1964
Sports in Pasadena, California